John Sinclair AO (13 July 1939 – 3 February 2019) received the Global 500 Roll of Honour award in 1990, and was awarded the Goldman Environmental Prize in 1993.

Early life 
Born in Maryborough, Queensland, Australia, Sinclair fought for thirty years to protect Fraser Island, and succeeded in stopping logging of the island's rainforest, and sand mining by multinational corporations.

Sinclair was made an Officer of the Order of Australia (AO) in the 2014 Australia Day Honours for "distinguished service to conservation and the environment, through advocacy and leadership roles with a range of organisations, and to natural resource management and protection".

Sinclair died on 3 February 2019 in the Wesley Hospital in Auchenflower, Brisbane from prostate cancer. He is survived by his partner, four sons and nine grandchildren.

References

1939 births
2019 deaths
Australian environmentalists
People from Maryborough, Queensland
Officers of the Order of Australia
Goldman Environmental Prize awardees